Milan is a city in Dodge and Telfair counties in the U.S. state of Georgia. The population was 700 at the 2010 census, down from 1,012 in 2000.

History
Milan was founded in the 1880s when the railroad was extended to that point. The Georgia General Assembly incorporated Milan as a town in 1891. The city was named after Milan, in Italy.

On May 25, 1919, at the age of 72, a black man named Berry Washington defended two young black girls who were attacked by two drunken white men. A mob of 75 to 100 white men hung him from a post, then shot his corpse to pieces. In spite of a $1,000 reward offered by Governor Dorsey, no one was ever arrested.

Geography
Milan is located in southeastern Dodge County and northwestern Telfair County at  (32.020195, -83.064091). The county boundary passes through the center of the city. U.S. Route 280 passes through the city just south of the center, leading east  to McRae and west  to Abbeville.

Demographics

2020 census

As of the 2020 United States census, there were 613 people, 269 households, and 168 families residing in the city.

2000 census
As of the census of 2000, there were 1,012 people, 326 households, and 215 families residing in the town. The racial makeup of the town was 64.72% White, 34.88% African American, and 0.40% from two or more races. Hispanic or Latino of any race were 1.28% of the population.

There were 326 households, out of which 28.8% had children under the age of 18 living with them, 52.5% were married couples living together, 10.7% had a female householder with no husband present, and 34.0% were non-families. 32.2% of all households were made up of individuals, and 18.7% had someone living alone who was 65 years of age or older.  The average household size was 2.34 and the average family size was 2.97.

In the town the population was spread out, with 18.2% under the age of 18, 14.9% from 18 to 24, 32.1% from 25 to 44, 21.6% from 45 to 64, and 13.1% who were 65 years of age or older.  The median age was 36 years. For every 100 females, there were 154.9 males.  For every 100 females age 18 and over, there were 166.2 males.

The median income for a household in the town was $25,461, and the median income for a family was $33,438. Males had a median income of $28,750 versus $18,750 for females. The per capita income for the town was $12,451.  About 19.8% of families and 22.8% of the population were below the poverty line, including 29.7% of those under age 18 and 28.8% of those age 65 or over.

Notable person
Wayne Cooper, former NBA basketball player, born in Milan

References

Cities in Dodge County, Georgia
Cities in Telfair County, Georgia
Cities in Georgia (U.S. state)